The 2020–21 Coastal Carolina Chanticleers men's basketball team represented Coastal Carolina University in the 2020–21 NCAA Division I men's basketball season. The Chanticleers, led by 14th-year head coach Cliff Ellis, played their home games at the HTC Center in Conway, South Carolina as members of the Sun Belt Conference. With the creation of divisions to cut down on travel due to the COVID-19 pandemic, they played in the East Division. they finished the season 18–8, 9–5 in Sun Belt play to finish in second place in the East Division. They defeated Troy in the quarterfinals of the Sun Belt tournament before losing to Appalachian State in the semifinals. They received a bid to the College Basketball Invitational where they defeated Bryant and Stetson to advance to the CBI championship game. There they lost to Pepperdine.

Previous season
The Chanticleers finished the 2019–20 season 16–17, 8–12 in Sun Belt play to finish in a three-way tie for eighth place. They defeated UT Arlington in the first round of the Sun Belt tournament before losing in the second round to Appalachian State.

Roster

Schedule and results

|-
!colspan=12 style=| Non-conference regular season

|-
!colspan=9 style=| Sun Belt Conference regular season

|-
!colspan=12 style=| Sun Belt tournament
|-

|-
!colspan=12 style=| CBI
|-

|-

Source

References

Coastal Carolina Chanticleers men's basketball seasons
Coastal Carolina Chanticleers
Coastal Carolina Chanticleers men's basketball
Coastal Carolina Chanticleers men's basketball
Coastal